Asadhyudu is a 2006 Indian Telugu-language action film written and directed by Anil Krishna in his directorial debut. Produced by Vallurupalli Ramesh Babu under Maharishi Cinema banner, the film stars Nandamuri Kalyan Ram, Diya, Chalapathi Rao, and Ravi Kale. Music was scored by Chakri, while Vikram Dharma choreographed the action sequences. The film follows Pardhoo, a Vizag-based college student who refuses to be a bystander while something evil is happening in front of him. Unable to tolerate injustice, he decides to fight a gang led by Hyderabad-based criminal brothers named Prakash and Thambi.

The film's script was developed by Anil Krishna while he was in Mumbai. He wanted to cast Kalyan Ram after watching a promo of his film Toli Choopulone. As Kalyan Ram was busy shooting for Athanokkade with Surender Reddy, Krishna narrated the script to various actors including Kannada film actor Puneeth Rajkumar and producer Medikonda Murali Krishna who liked the script but couldn't work on it due to date issues. It was upon his return to Hyderabad that producer Vallurupalli Ramesh Babu asked him if he were interested in narrating a story to Kalyan Ram, and the actor immediately decided to work with Krishna upon listening to the script narrated to him within one and a half hours. The film was initially titled Parthu after the protagonist, but changes were made and the title was later changed to Asadhyudu.
 
The film was released theatrically on 16 February 2006, receiving praise for Kalyan Ram's performance and action sequences. However, it failed commercially at the box office.

Plot 
Pardhoo (Nandamuri Kalyan Ram), a college boy who hates to see inequality around him, fights a dangerous criminal gang in Hyderabad run by two brothers Prakash (Ravi Kale) and Thambi.

Cast 

 Nandamuri Kalyan Ram as Pardhoo
 Diya as Madhuri
 Ravi Kale as Prakash
 Chalapathi Rao as Pardhu's father
 Kavitha as Pardhu's mother
 Vinayakan as Thambu
 Charan Raj as Raghunath
 Satyam Rajesh as Pardhu's friend
 Ahuti Prasad as ACP Ram
 Sudeepa Pinky as Pardhu's sister
 Vinod Kumar as ACP Ravi Varma
 Raghu Babu as Govind, Prakash's henchman
 Krishna Bhagavan as Prakash's lawyer
 G. V. Sudhakar Naidu as Prakash's henchman
 Preeti Nigam as ACP Ram's wife
 Jeeva as Varadarajulu
 Devadas Kanakala
 Prudhviraj as Prakash's henchman
 Kaushal Manda as College student
 Fish Venkat as Prakash's henchman

Soundtrack
The music was composed by Chakri and released by Aditya Music. The audio launch function was held on 25 January 2006 at Annapurna studios.

References

External links
 

2000s Telugu-language films
2006 action films
2006 films
Indian action films
Films scored by Chakri